Horné Vestenice is a village and municipality in Prievidza District in the Trenčín Region of western Slovakia.

History
In historical records the village was first mentioned in 1332.

Geography
The municipality lies at an altitude of 260 metres and covers an area of 9.963 km². It has a population of about 610 people.

Genealogical resources

The records for genealogical research are available at the state archive "Statny Archiv in Nitra, Slovakia"

 Roman Catholic church records (births/marriages/deaths): 1702-1935 (parish A)

See also
 List of municipalities and towns in Slovakia

References

External links
 
https://web.archive.org/web/20100603212801/http://www.horne-vestenice.sk/
Surnames of living people in Horne Vestenice

Villages and municipalities in Prievidza District